The London Image Festival (LIF) is an annual festival showing international photography and cinematography. The festival's open competition, which allows entries from photographers of any skill level, has a £1000 grand prize.

References

External links 

Annual events in London
Photography festivals
Arts festivals in England
Photography in the United Kingdom